Église Sainte-Marie is a Catholic church in Church Point, Nova Scotia, Canada. It is one of the largest and tallest wooden buildings in North America. The church spire rises  from floor to steeple, with its cross adding another . Originally  taller, the church steeple was struck by lightning in 1914, requiring part of the spire to be rebuilt.

History
The first church built in the Church Point area, part of Nova Scotia's French Shore, was at Grosses Coques. Built in 1774, it was a rough chapel to serve the needs of Acadians returning from Massachusetts, and other areas, following the Great Upheaval, the deportation of the Acadians. A second chapel was built in 1786 on a point of land jutting into St. Mary's Bay, giving rise to the name "Church Point".

A third church was built following the arrival of Jean-Mandé Sigogne, the first resident priest. This church was built along the main road in the community, where the parish cemetery is now located, rather than on the point. A large number of Mi'kmaq visited him at Sainte-Marie and attended his services at regular intervals. A bilingual Mi'kmaq-French catechism used by Sigogne at this church has survived and is now held by the National Archives in Ottawa. The church burned down in September 1820. It was rebuilt in a classical Georgian style, and served the community from 1829 to 1905, when the present church was opened.

Construction on the present church began in 1903. Father Pierre-Marie Dagnaud, a Eudist Roman Catholic priest, was appointed the head of Collège Sainte-Anne in 1899, thereby becoming the parish priest of St. Mary's. He decided on the construction of a grand church, and hired Arthur Regnault of Rennes, France as his architect. The church was built by master carpenter Léo Melanson, with the assistance of 1500 parishioners.

Due to dwindling attendance and rising maintenance/repair cost, the church held its last service on Christmas Eve of 2019. With repair cost estimated at $3 million, the Société Édifice Sainte-Marie de la Pointe was set the deadline of September 2021 to raise the required funds.

Construction
The design of the church was influenced by the architecture of the famous chateaux of the Loire Valley and by the design of the church in Father Dagnaud's home town of Bains-sur-Oust, France. The central steeple is flanked by a pair of turrets, with four more turrets surrounding the spire.

The church is exposed to the strong winds from St. Mary's Bay, so  of stone ballast were used to stabilize the steeple, and canvas, rather than plaster, was used for the walls.

The steeple holds three bronze bells imported from France, the largest weighing almost .

Interior
The interior of Église Sainte-Marie features a high, vaulted ceiling lit by a row of clerestory windows, below which runs a band of Romanesque arches around the church. The walls are painted white, and nine flower edged tableaux are painted on the central ceiling vaults. White oak pews have replaced the original chairs that were used for seating.

The church attracts thousands of tourists annually, and a museum room that is open to the public was established inside the church in 1970. The museum features a reliquary handcrafted by an Acadian artist from the region and a collection of religious and liturgical artifacts.

Notes

References
 Pacey, Elizabeth (1983). More Stately Mansions: Churches of Nova Scotia 1830–1910. Lancelot Press Ltd.
 Pacey, Elizabeth and Comiter, Alan (1994). Landmarks: Historic Buildings of Nova Scotia. Nimbus Publishing Ltd.

External links
 The Roman Catholic Diocese of Yarmouth
 Musée Église Sainte-Marie Museum

Roman Catholic churches in Nova Scotia
Museums in Digby County, Nova Scotia
Religious museums in Canada
Tourist attractions in Digby County, Nova Scotia
Buildings and structures in Digby County, Nova Scotia